The Singles, Volume II: 1960–1963 is the second compilation in a series of releases by Hip-O Select Records compiling the singles of James Brown. This compilation features all 7" single releases, including re-issues and cancelled singles. Many of the songs in this collection feature backing vocals by his singing group, The Famous Flames.

Track listing
Disc 1
"The Bells" (Billy Ward) – 2:59 – James Brown
"And I Do Just What I Want" (James Brown) – 2:26 – James Brown
"Hold It" (Clifford Scott, Billy Butler) – 2:12 – James Brown Presents His Band
"The Scratch" (James Alston) – 1:47 – James Brown Presents His Band
"Bewildered" (Leonard Whitcup, Teddy Powell) – 2:27 – James Brown & the Famous Flames
"If You Want Me" (James Brown) – 2:26 – James Brown & the Famous Flames
"Suds" (Nathaniel Kendrick) – 2:22 – James Brown Presents His Band
"Sticky" (James Brown, J.C. Davis) – 2:46 – James Brown Presents His Band
"I Don't Mind" (James Brown) – 2:47 – James Brown & the Famous Flames
"Love Don't Love Nobody" (Roy Brown) – 2:08 – James Brown & the Famous Flames
"Cross Firing" (James Brown) – 2:25 – James Brown Presents His Band
"Night Flying" (James Brown) – 2:18 – James Brown Presents His Band
"Baby, You're Right" (Joe Tex, James Brown) – 3:05 – James Brown & the Famous Flames
"I'll Never, Never Let You Go" (James Brown) – 2:22 – James Brown & the Famous Flames
"I Love You, Yes I Do" (Guy Wood, Edward Seiler, Sol Marcus, Sally Nix, Henry Glover) – 2:49 – James Brown & the Famous Flames
"Just You and Me, Darling" (James Brown) – 2:49 – James Brown & the Famous Flames
"Lost Someone" (James Brown, Eugene Stallworth, Bobby Byrd) – 3:08 – James Brown & the Famous Flames
"Night Train" (Oscar Washington, Lewis Simpkins, Jimmy Forrest) – 3:33 – James Brown & the Famous Flames
"Why Does Everything Happen to Me" (James Brown) – 2:11 – James Brown & the Famous Flames
"Bewildered" (Demo) (Leonard Whitcup, Teddy Powell) – 2:54 – James Brown & the Famous Flames

Disc 2
"Shout and Shimmy" (James Brown) – 2:52 – James Brown & the Famous Flames
"Come Over Here" (James Brown) – 2:46 – James Brown & the Famous Flames
"Mashed Potatoes U.S.A." (James Brown) – 2:54 – James Brown & the Famous Flames
"You Don't Have To Go" (James Brown) – 2:50 – James Brown & the Famous Flames
"(Can You) Feel It-Part 1" (James Brown) – 2:59 – James Brown Presents His Band
"(Can You) Feel It-Part 2" (James Brown) – 2:38 – James Brown Presents His Band
"Three Hearts in a Tangle" (R.S. Pennington, Sonny Thompson) – 2:55 – James Brown & the Famous Flames
"I've Got Money" (James Brown) – 2:32 – James Brown & the Famous Flames
"Like a Baby" (Jesse Stone) – 2:54 – James Brown & the Famous Flames
"Every Beat of My Heart" (Johnny Otis) – 3:46 – James Brown & the Famous Flames
"Prisoner of Love" (Leo Robin, Clarence Gaskill, Russ Columbo) – 2:29 – James Brown & the Famous Flames
"Choo-Choo" (James Brown) – 2:55 – James Brown & the Famous Flames
"These Foolish Things" (Holt Marvell, Jack Strachey, Harry Link) – 2:56 – James Brown & the Famous Flames
"(Can You) Feel It-Part 1" (James Brown) – 2:59 – James Brown Presents His Band
"Devil's Den-Part 1" (James Brown) – 2:40 – The Poets
"Devil's Den-Part 2" (James Brown) – 2:34 – The Poets
"Signed, Sealed, and Delivered" (Cowboy Copas, Syd Nathan) – 2:51 – James Brown & the Famous Flames
"Waiting in Vain" (Ivory Joe Hunter) – 2:48 – James Brown & the Famous Flames
"Oh Baby Don't You Weep-Part 1" (James Brown) – 2:58 – James Brown & the Famous Flames
"Oh Baby Don't You Weep-Part 2" (James Brown) – 3:03 – James Brown & the Famous Flames

External links
 The Singles, Volume II: 1960–1963 at Pitchfork Media

James Brown compilation albums
2007 compilation albums